Northward Hill is a  biological Site of Special Scientific Interest  Kent. It is a Nature Conservation Review site, Grade 2, and is also designated High Halstow National Nature Reserve The site is managed by the Royal Society for the Protection of Birds.

This site has mixed woodland, scrub, ponds, grassland and bracken. It has the largest heronry in Britain, with more than 200 pairs, and insects include the scarce sloe carpet and least carpet moths.

There is access by public footpaths from High Halstow.

References

Sites of Special Scientific Interest in Kent
National nature reserves in England
Nature Conservation Review sites
Royal Society for the Protection of Birds reserves in England